Swan Reach may refer to:

Swan Reach, South Australia
Swan Reach, Victoria